Ukur Yatani Kanacho is a Kenyan politician and ambassador, and was appointed as Treasury Secretary on 14 January 2020.

Yatani served as the First Governor of Marsabit County from 2013 to 2017, was the Permanent Representative to the United Nations in Vienna from 2009 to 2012, and served as the Member of Parliament for North Horr Constituency in 2006. In 2019 he served as the Cabinent Secretary for Labour and Social Protection. In 2020 he was named Cabinent Secretary or the National Treasury.

Early life and education 
Yatani was born in 1967 in Forole of North Horr sub-county to Yatani Kanacho, a prominent Gabra elder. In 1975, he started school in Maikona, and was then transferred to North Horr Primary school in 1978. Yatani sat for his Certificate of Primary Education (CPE) IN 1981 and emerged the top student in the then Marsabit District. He was given a scholarship by Jomo Kenyatta Foundation and he joined Garbatulla High school where he equally performed well and later joined Kabarnet High school for his A-levels between 1986 and 1987. 

Yatani received his Bachelor of Arts in Economics and Sociology from Egerton University in 1991. In 2005, he joined the University of York in the UK and studied a Master of Public Administration and Public Policy.

Political life 
Yatani became a District Officer for the Government of Kenya. Yatani quickly rose through the ranks from District Officer Cadet to a Senior District Officer and then promoted to a District Commissioner in July 2002. In this position he successfully coordinated state business, managed government resources, maintained law and order, directed disaster relief operations, and implemented long term strategic plans that improved government services and the lives of local residents.

Yatani was then called home by his constituents and elected as the Member of Parliament for North Horr constituency in 2006. During this time the Marsabit North District was created and M.P. Yatani spearheaded the formation of several administrative units across the constituency, leading to more independence and general improvement of service delivery.

Yatani was then appointed as the Assistant Minister, Ministry of Science and Technology. In this position he offered policy direction to the ministry, represented the government in local and international talks and negotiations, and assisted the Minister in performing of all ministerial and government functions.

In 2009, Yatani began a multi-year mission to advance the interests of Kenya on the international stage. He was named Ambassador to Austria in the Ministry of Foreign Affairs, and Kenya's Permanent Representative to the United Nations, Vienna. As the Ambassador to Austria, with accreditation to Hungary and Slovakia, he provided support and consular services to Kenyans living abroad and promoted trade and economic cooperation with a variety of European nations and thereby contributed to the realization of Kenya's Vision 2030. Amb. Yatani also served as the Board of Governors of the International Atomic Energy Agency for the International Atomic Energy Agency (IAEA), which works to promote the peaceful use of nuclear energy around the world. Among the many accomplishments of the IAEA during Yatani's tenure, was the strategic use of strength and diplomacy to deescalate and safeguard Iran's nuclear capacity.

In addition to this, Yatani held senior leadership positions at various diplomatic and international agencies at the United Nations and also chaired the African Group of Ambassadors.

In the 2013 Marsabit local elections Yatani was elected to pioneer the devolved County Government becoming the leader of the largest county in the nation. As the Marsabit County Governor he was tasked with building the newly formed county from scratch, and as the chief executive he brought peace, development and economic prosperity to the region. 

During his time as Governor, Yatani provided strategic leadership, guidance and oversight in setting up devolved governance structures, competent financial and human resource infrastructure and shaped the development agenda of Marsabit County. Throughout his term he promoted harmonious coexistence and cohesion among the fifteen indigenous ethnic communities and made Marsabit County one of the most peaceful in the country.

Yatani set out on an ambitious development journey and steered the roll-out of the County Integrated Development Plan (hailed as the best in the country by the UN) which included a variety of major initiatives, including the construction of new county offices, a four-storey modern market, a modern stadium, over a dozen health centers, and new tourist resort facility and 200 ECD classrooms.

The Yatani Government upgraded 5,000 kilometers of gravel roads, tarmacked Marsabit town roads, and drilling & operationalizing over fifty boreholes. During his tenure he established two referral hospitals, and purchased two dozen ambulances. He oversaw the installation of solar-based street lighting and drainage systems and stimulated an economic revival through investments in agriculture and livestock. Throughout his term he heavily supported cultural festivals and the Lake Turkana Cultural Festival was nominated for India's prestigious Tagore Award.

Yatani created strategic partnerships with the national government and major investors to bring two new roads to the county, as well as the largest wind power plant in Africa. In addition, he spearheaded a UNDP funded unique cross border program bringing jobs and billions of shillings of investment to the region. He also gained major external funding from the African Development Bank to create a livestock quarantine zone, modern abattoir and to develop international export markets for Marsabit's livestock products.

On 16 February 2018, Yatani was sworn in by the President of the Republic of Kenya, Uhuru Kenyatta for Cabinet Secretary of the Ministry of Labour and Social Protection.

On 24 July 2019 President Uhuru Kenyatta appointed Yatani as the Cabinet Secretary for Treasury on Acting capacity following the sacking of Henry Rotich. He was confirmed as the Cabinet Secretary on 24 January 2020.

Other activities
 African Development Bank (AfDB), Ex-Officio Member of the Board of Governors (2019–2022)
 East African Development Bank (EADB), Ex-Officio Member of the Governing Council (2019–2022)
 International Monetary Fund (IMF), Ex-Officio Member of the Board of Governors (2019–2022)
 P4G – Partnering for Green Growth and the Global Goals 2030, Member of the Board of Directors (2019–2022)
 World Bank, Ex-Officio Member of the Board of Governors (2019–2022)
 Vice-President of the Board of Governors The African Capacity Building Foundation (ACBF)

References 

Kenyan politicians
People from Marsabit County
1967 births
Living people